Pay It Forward is a model in the United States for financing higher education under which students attend college tuition-free, and after graduating begin to pay a fixed percentage into a fund to pay for future students' tuition. Pay It Forward legislation was first passed by the Oregon state legislature in 2013.

History
Pay It Forward was first proposed by the Economic Opportunity Institute. The idea became the focus of a capstone class at Portland State University, which hosted a legislative panel and presented a report to Oregon legislators on the model. A study bill on the program was sponsored by Rep. Michael Dembrow and passed unanimously in the Oregon legislature.

References

External links
 The Problem of Student Debt in Oregon and the Path Forward
 HB 3472
 Student Debt Legislative Panel - State Level Solutions

2013 in Oregon
Oregon law